Eric Adam Avery (born April 25, 1965) is an American musician. He is best known as the founding bass guitarist and co-songwriter of the alternative rock band Jane's Addiction, with whom he has recorded two studio albums. He is also currently the touring and recording bassist for Garbage, which he joined in 2005 as a sideman, and with whom he has recorded three studio albums.

A core member of Jane's Addiction during its initial lifespan, Avery co-founded the band in 1985 with frontman Perry Farrell, and recorded two studio albums, Nothing's Shocking (1988) and Ritual de lo Habitual (1990), before the band's acrimonious break-up in 1991. Following Jane's Addiction's dissolution, Avery and guitarist Dave Navarro formed Deconstruction with drummer Michael Murphy, releasing one studio album in 1994. The following year, Avery began a solo project named Polar Bear, which he focused on between 1995 and 2000. Declining to take part in Jane's Addiction's 1997 and 2001 reunions, Avery eventually rejoined the band in 2008. The original core line-up of the band embarked on a co-headlining tour with Nine Inch Nails, with Avery departing in 2010 due to ongoing tensions with Farrell. In 2022, Avery rejoined Jane's Addiction after a twelve-year absence, in advance of a co-headlining tour with the Smashing Pumpkins.

Alongside his work with Jane's Addiction, Avery is a former member of Alanis Morissette's backing band, and has been a touring and session musician for Garbage since 2005, contributing to the albums, Not Your Kind of People (2012), Strange Little Birds (2016) and No Gods No Masters (2021). Avery unofficially joined the Smashing Pumpkins in 2006 for a short spell, and was briefly a member of the rock supergroup Giraffe Tongue Orchestra. In 2013, Avery joined Nine Inch Nails in preparation for their extensive Twenty Thirteen Tour, before parting ways with the project ahead of the tour's commencement.

To date, Avery has released two solo studio albums under his own name, Help Wanted (2008) and LIFE.TIME. (2013).

Biography 
Eric Avery was born in Los Angeles, California. His father is the actor Brian Avery, perhaps best known for playing Carl Smith (who Dustin Hoffman famously keeps from marrying Katharine Ross) in The Graduate.

Avery and Dave Navarro met as classmates at St. Paul the Apostle Grammar School in West Los Angeles, a Catholic parochial school founded by the Paulist Father. Eric went on to St. Monica High School  of Santa Monica, California, and Notre Dame High School in Sherman Oaks, California. Dave was classmates at Notre Dame with Stephen Perkins. Stephen met Eric's sister, Rebecca Avery, and they dated. Rebecca suggested that Eric and Perry Farrell audition Stephen as the drummer for Jane's Addiction after Perry and Eric cofounded the band.

Avery kept a fairly low profile after the first demise of Jane's Addiction, participating in the Deconstruction project with Navarro immediately after Jane's Addiction's breakup, but initially declining invitations for Jane's reunions. "I've asked him," said Farrell before 2001's Jubilee Tour, "but he says he wants no part of it. What else can you say but, Good luck to ya?"

Avery has recorded tracks for, toured with and briefly dated Alanis Morissette, as well as creating another side project, Polar Bear, in 1994. He was once suggested as the replacement bassist for Tool by former Jane's Addiction and then-current Tool manager Ted Gardner. Eric declined the invitation, saying he wanted to concentrate on Polar Bear.

As seen in the film Metallica: Some Kind of Monster, Avery auditioned for Metallica, after the departure of bassist Jason Newsted. The role didn't quite fit Avery and the band went with Ozzy Osbourne and Suicidal Tendencies bassist Robert Trujillo. Avery toured with the band Garbage to promote 2005's Bleed Like Me. Avery has also performed with Peter Murphy, on tour and on 2004's Unshattered.

Avery worked briefly with the revived Smashing Pumpkins, but ultimately did not join the band. He was not paid for his work, but said the sessions were a lot of fun: "I went into [the Pumpkins] with the same mentality I took with me when I auditioned for Metallica – I expected to have a good story to tell my wife. I had no expectations. I had heard nothing but bad things about working with Billy, but I went, and I found it to be a really inspiring time." Billy Corgan ended up playing bass on what would become 2007's Zeitgeist and hired Ginger Reyes for live performances.

In 2007, he contributed original music to the feature film documentary The 11th Hour. He also released his debut solo album Help Wanted in April 2008 through Dangerbird Records.

He finally performed with Jane's Addiction – for the first time since 1991 – at the NME Awards in 2008. Jane's played secret club shows in October and November 2008. On March 19, 2009, at South by Southwest Music festival in Austin, the quartet performed a 45-minute set at an abandoned Safeway grocery store.

Jane's Addiction's official website was updated in February 2009 stating that there was to be another club show soon. Photos of Avery, Perkins and Navarro, taken by Trent Reznor, appeared on Nine Inch Nails' official site, which led to speculation that Reznor was helping Jane's record new material. The relationship led to the booking of the "NIN/JA" (Nine Inch Nails/Jane's Addiction) tour, on which Avery played, and which evoked the first Lollapalooza tour of 1991, starring Jane's and Nine Inch Nails.

On March 1, 2010, after a ten-date rescheduled tour in Australia, Avery stated on his Twitter page: "the janes addiction experiment is at an end."  Rumors were already spreading around a few weeks before, as Duff McKagan was said to be the new bassist for Jane's, but Avery had kept his position for the remaining few dates of the 2009/2010 tour.

In February 2012, Justin Meldal-Johnsen commented on the talkbass.com forum that Avery would be joining Garbage on their upcoming tour. In early May 2012 Garbage uploaded a video from their rehearsal, performing the song "Battle in Me", with Avery playing bass. Avery has since performed in the two Garbage tours that followed, the band's 20th anniversary tour and the one for the album Strange Little Birds, in which Avery plays bass in six tracks.

Avery released his second solo album, entitled LIFE.TIME., on February 15, 2013.

On February 25, 2013, Trent Reznor named Avery as the new touring bassist of Nine Inch Nails. Avery was slated to perform in the Twenty Thirteen Tour from Summer 2013 into 2014, but announced his withdrawal on May 15, 2013, stating that after a year travelling with Garbage he did not feel like going on another extended tour.

Avery composed the original soundtrack for Show Me What You Got, written and directed by Svetlana Cvetko and winner of the Grand Jury Prize ‘Best Film’ at Taormina Film Festival in 2019.

Style
A self-taught bassist, Avery has singled Peter Hook of Joy Division and New Order as his major influence on bass playing, considering that British bassists were deeper with the instrument as "American rock bass is kick drum, it's just kick drum and then the root note of what the guitar player is doing." In Jane's Addiction, Avery stated that in the early phases the basslines would end up as a replacement rhythm guitar, "sort of built on that so Dave can riff on it and Stephen also can riff on it". On his solo career, Avery only played the bass at the final stages of Help Wanted, instead "focused on gadgets and keyboards and guitars and vocals and lyrics and other things like that". While playing with Garbage, Avery was for the first time "playing a more traditional bass role in a rock band" as his bass would only try to match Butch Vig's drumming.

"Nothing's Shocking influenced me a lot, especially with what Eric Avery proposed from the bass," says Nick Oliveri, of Queens of the Stone Age, Kyuss and Mondo Generator. "Eric had written the music on his own, the guitars and the drums came later. So he inspired me on that side"

John Frusciante of the Red Hot Chili Peppers stated on the Stadium Arcadium commentary that his guitar playing style is influenced by Avery's spacious and heavily melodic playing.

Selected Discography

Solo career 
 2008 Help Wanted
 2013 LIFE.TIME.

Jane's Addiction 
 1987 Jane's Addiction
 1988 Nothing's Shocking
 1990 Ritual de lo Habitual
 1991 Live and Rare (Compilation of B-Sides and the Remix of "Been Caught Stealing")
 1997 Kettle Whistle (Compilation of live tracks, demos and unreleased material)
 2006 Up from the Catacombs (Greatest hits album)
 2009 A Cabinet of Curiosities (Box set)
 2009 NINJA 2009 Tour Sampler
 2023 TBA

Deconstruction 
 1994 Deconstruction

Polar Bear 
 1996 Self-titled
 1997 Chewing Gum EP
 1999 Why Something Instead of Nothing?

Garbage 
2012 Not Your Kind of People (2 tracks)
2013 One Mile High... Live (DVD)
2016 Strange Little Birds (6 tracks)
2021 No Gods No Masters (3 tracks)

Peter Murphy 
2015 Wild Birds Live Tour

Guest appearances 
2002 Under Rug Swept (Alanis Morissette album)
2002 Feast On Scraps (AM compilation album)
2004 So-Called Chaos (AM)
2004 Unshattered (Peter Murphy album)
2019 To Be One With You (Pluralone's debut album)
2022 This Is The Show (Pluralone's 3rd album)
2023 Every Loser (Iggy Pop's 19th album)

References

External links 
 Polar Bear Band Site: Gavin gets direct updates from Eric Avery on this site.
 JanesAddiction.org: Extensive Eric Avery discography.
 ericavery.blogspot.com: Eric's official blog
 An interview with Avery on The Skeptics' Guide to the Universe where he tells the audience about his skeptic beliefs.
 

1965 births
American rock bass guitarists
American male bass guitarists
Living people
Jane's Addiction members
University High School (Los Angeles) alumni
American atheists
Alternative metal bass guitarists
Nine Inch Nails members
Guitarists from Los Angeles
American male guitarists
20th-century American guitarists
Deconstruction (band) members
21st-century American guitarists
Notre Dame High School (Sherman Oaks, California) alumni
Dangerbird Records artists